Campbell's Soup Cans  II is a work of art produced in 1969 by Andy Warhol as part of his Campbell's Soup Cans series. 250 sets of this print were made, and edition #17 is in the collection at the Museum of Contemporary Art, Chicago.  It consists of ten prints:

Tomato Beef Noodle O
Chicken 'n Dumplings
Vegetarian Vegetable
Clam Chowder
Old fashioned vegetable made with beef stock
Scotch Broth
Cheddar Cheese
Oyster Stew
Golden Mushroom
Hot Dog Bean

References 

1969 paintings
Paintings by Andy Warhol
Painting series
Campbell Soup Company